Katharina Büche (born 19 June 1974) is an Austrian former professional tennis player.

Büche competed professionally in the 1990s, reaching a top ranking of 202. She featured in the qualifying draws for both the Australian Open and Wimbledon during her career. Her best WTA Tour performances came at the Linz Open, where she twice made the second round, including in 1994 when she had a first round win over Virginia Ruano Pascual.

ITF finals

Singles: 1 (0–1)

References

External links
 
 

1974 births
Living people
Austrian female tennis players